The 2012 MSBL season was the 24th season of the Men's State Basketball League (SBL). The regular season began on Friday 16 March and ended on Saturday 28 July. The finals began on Saturday 4 August and ended on Saturday 1 September, when the Cockburn Cougars defeated the East Perth Eagles in the MSBL Grand Final.

Regular season
The regular season began on Friday 16 March and ended on Saturday 28 July after 20 rounds of competition. An additional round was added in 2012 to lighten the travel load of regional teams.

Due to an ineligible player taking part in SBL qualifying games, the Willetton Tigers were deemed to have forfeited three games that were won across June and July. In rounds thirteen to nineteen, the Tigers suited up a player for a total of seven games and failed to lodge a contract, player registration and proof of citizenship which are all documents required by the league before a player is eligible to play. As a result, they were dropped from a 12–13 record to 9–16 heading into the final round.

Standings

Finals
The finals began on Saturday 4 August and ended on Saturday 1 September with the MSBL Grand Final.

Bracket

Awards

Statistics leaders

Regular season
 Most Valuable Player: Damian Matacz (Wanneroo Wolves)
 Coach of the Year: Jason Chalk (Mandurah Magic)
 Most Improved Player: Michael Vigor (Perth Redbacks)
 All-Star Five:
 PG: Joel Wagner (Perth Redbacks)
 SG: Luke Payne (Lakeside Lightning)
 SF: Ty Harrelson (Goldfields Giants)
 PF: Damian Matacz (Wanneroo Wolves)
 C: Tom Jervis (East Perth Eagles)

Finals
 Grand Final MVP: Jeremiah Wilson (Cockburn Cougars)

References

External links
 2012 fixtures
 Week Four Player of the Week

2012
2011–12 in Australian basketball
2012–13 in Australian basketball